The Skoda 149 mm Model 1928 gun was a Czechoslovak long-range, dual-purpose cannon designed for the attack of static fortifications and coastal defence duties. About 20 were bought by Yugoslavia and more by Romania. Guns captured by Nazi Germany after the Invasion of Yugoslavia were used by the Heer as the 15 cm Kanone 403(j). It was tested by the Czechs as the 15 cm kanon NO, but was not purchased.

The gun was mounted on a metal firing platform to give it 360° traverse. It was transported in three loads.

References 
 Chamberlain, Peter & Gander, Terry. Heavy Artillery. New York: Arco, 1975 
 Gander, Terry and Chamberlain, Peter. Weapons of the Third Reich: An Encyclopedic Survey of All Small Arms, Artillery and Special Weapons of the German Land Forces 1939-1945. New York: Doubleday, 1979 
 http://www.worldwar2.ro/arme/?article=305 

World War II field artillery
Artillery of Czechoslovakia
150 mm artillery
Military equipment introduced in the 1920s